Pervâneoğlu (in Turkish plural Pervâneoğulları, 'sons of the pervâne') was an Anatolian beylik of Persian origin, centered in Sinop on the Black Sea coast and controlling the immediately surrounding region in the second half of the 13th century and the beginning of the 14th (1261–1326).

The founder of the beylik, the pervâne Mu'in al-Din Parwana. His grandson the Gazi Çelebi, last Bey of Pervane, transformed his realm into a serious regional naval power, conducting raids against Genoese possessions in the Black Sea and Crimea, as well as against the Empire of Trebizond.

See also

 List of Sunni Muslim dynasties
List of Iranian dynasties and countries

References

External links

 Beylik of Pervâneoğlu 

Anatolian beyliks
History of Sinop Province
States and territories established in the 1260s